Ben Hawkey (born 25 April 1996) is an actor from Kingston upon Thames. He is best known for his portrayal of Hot Pie in the HBO series Game of Thrones. He also played Rick Jnr in the E4 series Beaver Falls. He retired from acting in 2017.

Filmography

Television

Other ventures 
In addition to acting, Hawkey partnered with UK food delivery service Deliveroo to launch a fictional Game of Thrones-inspired "bakery", You Know Nothing John Dough.

References

External links 
 

1996 births
Living people
21st-century British male actors
British male television actors
British male film actors